Othman Moqbel is a British-Palestinian non-profit executive. He is currently CEO of Action For Humanity, the parent charity of Syria Relief, the largest Syria-focused NGO in the UK. He was formerly a trustee of AVECO, Charity Futures. and was CEO of Human Appeal from 2010 to 2017.

In 2017, Othman Moqbel was nominated for the BOND Humanitarian Award.

Education and early career

Moqbel earned his BA and MA in Islamic Studies from the University of Jordan (Amman) and holds a diploma in Muslim Chaplaincy from the Markfield Institute of Higher Education (Leicester). He previously served as a Muslim faith adviser to the University of Nottingham.

He previously worked with Human Appeal and as a project manager for another charity, Muslim Hands. He has also served as president of the Federation of Student Islamic Societies in the UK and Ireland (FOSIS), and as a facilitator for youth leadership and development courses with the Muslim Student Trust.

Action For Humanity 

Othman Moqbel is CEO of Action For Humanity, who are the parent charity of Syria Relief. Mr Moqbel led the rebrand in order to reach beyond Syria and have a more international presence.,

Human Appeal 
Othman Moqbel was the CEO of the long-standing UK based NGO, Human Appeal until May 2018. During his time there the charity increased its reach both internally, having established new programmes in the UK, and externally, having worked in 25 countries worldwide. Projects now span across 24 countries worldwide and have seen a drastic increase in beneficiaries as well as long-term sustainable development programmes. Most recently, Othman Moqbel and Human Appeal launched an appeal for the victims of the Manchester attack. Moqbel emphasises that no matter what background, faith, religion, ethnicity – everybody must stand united against anyone who wants to divide people.

In 2013 Human Appeal were awarded the International Charity Award at the Global Peace & Unity Festival, followed by being named “Charity of the Year” at the 2017 British Muslim Awards for their outstanding achievements and contribution to British society.

Allegations and libel damages

In 2013 the Jewish Chronicle paid an undisclosed amount of libel damages to Othman Moqbel and two trustees of Human Appeal after accusing the organization of having ties to terrorism.

Human Appeal “categorically” denies any link to Hamas and the Charity Commission confirmed that Human Appeal was not “under any investigation”.

References

Living people
Year of birth missing (living people)